Mirror Lakes are a set of lakes lying north of Lake Te Anau and immediately to the west of the road from Te Anau to Milford Sound in New Zealand.

The lakes are only a 5-minute walk away from the car park along a wheelchair-friendly boardwalk.  A wooden viewing platform and short walking track run along the lakes, one of which has a deliberately mirrored sign mounted just above the water's surface, so that the name "Mirror Lakes" is shown correctly in its reflection.  On a calm day, the Earl Mountains can be seen reflected in the water.

References

External links

Lakes of Fiordland